Jean Lomami (born 27 July 1982) is a Rwandan footballer. He played in 23 matches for the Rwanda national football team from 2003 to 2009. He was also named in Rwanda's squad for the 2004 African Cup of Nations tournament.

References

1982 births
Living people
Rwandan footballers
Rwanda international footballers
2004 African Cup of Nations players
Association football forwards
Sportspeople from Bujumbura